is a Japanese surname.

People
 Fuka Koshiba (born 1997), Japanese actress
 Hiroshi Koshiba (1884–1925), one of the founders of the Japanese Scouting movement
 Joshua Koshiba (born 1943), politician
 Kenji Koshiba, wrestler
 Masatoshi Koshiba (1926–2020), physicist
 Peoria Koshiba (born 1979), sprinter
 Shigeru Koshiba, manga artist
 Tetsuya Koshiba, Japanese illustrator who helped work on the manga called Remote from 2002

Fictional characters
 Kiri Koshiba a fictional character who's also a hairstylist, and the main protagonist from the manga, Beauty Pop.
 Azami Koshiba, a Java sparrow and supporting character from the bird-themed video game/interactive novel, Hatoful Boyfriend for Microsoft Windows PC.

References

Japanese-language surnames